Antonín Šváb may refer to:
Antonín Šváb Sr., Czechoslovakian speedway rider, 1970 Individual Ice Racing World Champion
Antonín Šváb Jr., his son, Czech speedway rider, 1993-95 Individual Speedway Junior World Championship finalist